KYLK (103.7 FM,) is a radio station licensed to serve Okemah, Oklahoma. The station is owned by EMF. It airs a contemporary Christian music format.

The station has been assigned these call letters by the Federal Communications Commission since August 25, 2011.

Construction permit
On January 26, 2007, the station was granted a construction permit to relocate its community of license to Okemah, Oklahoma. This change in effective radiated power was to 100,000 watts and a change in antenna height above average terrain to 282 meters (926 feet). The new transmitter is located at 35°15'47"N, 96°22'43"W. The license to cover for the station was granted 2-26-08.

First signed on as KESC, changed calls to KOCD. The callsign KOCD was formerly used at CD105.3 until it became KJML K105.3 of Columbus, KS/Joplin, MO.

From Bright AC to Contemporary Adult Variety Hits
On July 16, 2010, KOCD changed format to Contemporary Adult Variety Hits and changed its brand to OKlahoma's New 103.7. The new format, developed by Phil Hall's Audience Bakery (http://audiencebakery.com), features an uptempo mix of various contemporary music styles from the 70s, 80s, 90s, and today. The mix includes Top 40 hits from the 70s, R&B, Pop, Alternative, and Rock hits. OKlahoma's New 103.7 is targeted to adult 25-54. The trademarked tagline is "Building The Playlist You've Always Wanted."

The radio station spotlights events and happenings around Oklahoma with air personalities John Hart, Tim Howard, Steve Nichols, and Dean Wendt. Former KOTV-Tulsa Sports Director and ESPN SportsCenter host Bob Stevens delivers morning drive sports. Susan Darwin and Bob Crowley deliver news during drive time.

OKlahoma's New 103.7 had a website at OK1037.com and streamed at 128kbit/s on the website, Facebook, and with a free iPhone app.

From Smooth Jazz to Bright AC
KOCD changed its format from Smooth Jazz to a rhythmic-based AC format in April 2010. Like the former Smooth Jazz format, the new format was delivered via satellite from Broadcast Architecture and is known as the Bright Radio Network (while still using BA's Smooth Jazz Network air staff, including Brian Culbertson mornings and Dave Koz during afternoon drive). Featured artists include the likes of Mariah Carey, Alicia Keys, Michael Jackson, Sade, Madonna, John Mayer, Norah Jones, and Rihanna, while most if not all of the instrumental music that comprised the former jazz format has been eliminated.  (1) The network's tagline is "Music That Feels Good."

From Bright AC to silent to KLOVE
On May 1, 2011, KOCD went silent and a sale to EMF was pending. On September 12, 2011, KLOVE signed on the KOCD signal.

103.7 is now KYLK.

Translators

References

External links

Radio stations established in 2002
2002 establishments in Oklahoma
YLK